Peer pressure refers to a process of social influence on an individual.

Peer pressure may also refer to:

 Peer Pressure (game show), American TV production
 "Peer Pressure" (James Bay song), featuring Julia Michaels, 2019
 "Peer Pressure" (Mobb Deep song), 1992
 "Peer Pressure", a song by De La Soul from the 2001 album AOI: Bionix
 "Peer Pressure", a song by Pretty Ricky from the 2007 album Late Night Special
 "Peer Pressure", a 1979 song by Necros

See also
 Pier Pressure (disambiguation)